Zeller Bach is a river of Bavaria, Germany. It flows into the Kressenbach (the upper course of the Memminger Aach) near Memmingen.

See also
List of rivers of Bavaria

References

Rivers of Bavaria
Rivers of Germany